Trevor Findlay is director of the Nuclear Energy Futures Project at the Centre for International Governance Innovation (CIGI) in Waterloo, Ontario. He heads the CIGI project on the future of the IAEA. Findlay wrote the report on the Future of Nuclear Energy to 2030 which said that "transparency and collaboration should be engendered by establishing a global nuclear safety network encompassing all stakeholders -relevant international organizations, governments, civil society and, most vitally, the nuclear industry".

Findlay is also a professor at the Norman Paterson School of International Affairs and director of the Canadian Centre for Treaty Compliance at Carleton University.

See also 
 Louise Fréchette
 Benjamin K. Sovacool
 Amory Lovins
 Mycle Schneider
 Stephen Thomas (economist)
 Renewable energy policy
 Nuclear energy policy

References 

-

People associated with energy
Canadian environmentalists
Living people
Year of birth missing (living people)